The Indonesian mountain weasel (Mustela lutreolina) is a species of weasel that lives on the islands of Java and Sumatra in Indonesia at elevations over 1,000 metres (3,280 ft). They live in mountainous, tropical, and rainforest areas. Indonesian mountain weasels have a body length of 11–12 inches and a tail length of 5–6 inches. They are reddish-brown in color.

The Indonesian mountain weasel is endangered due to hunting, fur trade, and destruction of habitat. There are no recognized subspecies of the Indonesian mountain weasel.

Food habits
Indonesian mountain weasels are carnivorous, and are especially adapted to eating rodents. They are able to kill prey much larger than themselves due to their speed and agility.

References

Weasels
Mammals of Indonesia
Endemic fauna of Indonesia
Taxa named by Oldfield Thomas
Mammals described in 1917